Summer Set is an unincorporated community and census-designated place (CDP) in Jefferson County, Missouri, United States. It is a residential community built around three artificial lakes: Summerset Lake, Winterhaven Lake, and Spring Lake.

Summer Set was first listed as a CDP prior to the 2020 census.

Demographics

References 

Census-designated places in Jefferson County, Missouri
Census-designated places in Missouri